The word Japan is an exonym, and is used (in one form or another) by many languages. The Japanese names for Japan are Nihon and Nippon. They are both written in Japanese using the kanji .

During the third-century CE Three Kingdoms period, Japan was inhabited by the Yayoi people who lived in Kyushu up to the Kanto region. They were called Wa in Chinese, and the kanji for their name  can be translated as "dwarf" or "submissive". The earliest record of  appears in the Chinese Old Book of Tang, which notes the change in 703 when Japanese envoys requested that its name be changed. It is believed that the name change within Japan itself took place sometime between 665 and 703. Marco Polo called Japan 'Cipangu' around 1300, based on the Chinese name, probably  (compare modern Min Nan pronunciation ji̍t pún kok). In the 16th century in Malacca, Portuguese traders first heard from Malay and Indonesian the names Jepang, Jipang, and Jepun. In 1577 it was first recorded in English, spelled Giapan. At the end of the 16th century, Portuguese missionaries came to Japan and created grammars and dictionaries of Middle Japanese. The 1603–1604 dictionary Vocabvlario da Lingoa de Iapam has 2 entries: nifon and iippon. Since then many derived names of Japan appeared on ancient European maps.

History

Both Nippon and Nihon literally mean "the sun's origin", that is, where the sun originates, and are often translated as the Land of the Rising Sun. This nomenclature comes from Imperial correspondence with the Chinese Sui Dynasty and refers to Japan's eastern position relative to China. Wa was a name early China used to refer to an ethnic group living in Japan around the time of the Three Kingdoms Period. The Yayoi people primarily lived on the island of Kyushu to the Kanto region on Honshu.

Although the etymological origins of "Wa" remain uncertain, Chinese historical texts recorded an ancient people residing in the Japanese archipelago (perhaps Kyūshū), named something like *ˀWâ or *ˀWər . Carr (1992:9–10) surveys prevalent proposals for Wa's etymology ranging from feasible (transcribing Japanese first-person pronouns waga  "my; our" and ware  "I; oneself; thou") to shameful (writing Japanese Wa as  implying "dwarf"), and summarizes interpretations for *ˀWâ "Japanese" into variations on two etymologies: "behaviorally 'submissive' or physically 'short'."  The first "submissive; obedient" explanation began with the (121 CE) Shuowen Jiezi dictionary. It defines  as shùnmào  "obedient/submissive/docile appearance", graphically explains the "person; human" radical  with a wěi  "bent" phonetic, and quotes the above Shijing poem. "Conceivably, when Chinese first met Japanese," Carr (1992:9) suggests "they transcribed Wa as *ˀWâ 'bent back' signifying 'compliant' bowing/obeisance. Bowing is noted in early historical references to Japan." Examples include "Respect is shown by squatting" (Hou Han Shu, tr. Tsunoda 1951:2), and "they either squat or kneel, with both hands on the ground. This is the way they show respect." (Wei Zhi, tr. Tsunoda 1951:13). Koji Nakayama interprets wēi  "winding" as "very far away" and euphemistically translates Wō  as "separated from the continent." The second etymology of wō  meaning "dwarf, pygmy" has possible cognates in ǎi  "low, short (of stature)", wō  "strain; sprain; bent legs", and wò  "lie down; crouch; sit (animals and birds)". Early Chinese dynastic histories refer to a Zhūrúguó  "pygmy/dwarf country" located south of Japan, associated with possibly Okinawa Island or the Ryukyu Islands. Carr cites the historical precedence of construing Wa as "submissive people" and the "Country of Dwarfs" legend as evidence that the "little people" etymology was a secondary development.

Chinese, Korean, and Japanese scribes regularly wrote Wa or Yamato "Japan" with the Chinese character  until the 8th century, when the Japanese found fault with it due to its offensive connotation, replacing it with  "harmony, peace, balance".  Retroactively, this character was adopted in Japan to refer to the country itself, often combined with the character  (literally meaning "Great"), so as to write the name as Yamato (Great Wa, in a manner similar to e.g.  Great Qing Empire,  Empire of Great Britain).  However, the pronunciation Yamato cannot be formed from the sounds of its constituent characters; it refers to a place in Japan and, based on the specific spellings used in ancient documents (see also Man'yōgana and Old Japanese#Vowels), this may have originally meant .

 Such words which use certain kanji to name a certain Japanese word solely for the purpose of representing the word's meaning regardless of the given kanji's on'yomi or kun'yomi, a.k.a. jukujikun, is not uncommon in Japanese. Other original names in Chinese texts include Yamatai country, where a Queen Himiko lived.  When hi no moto, the indigenous Japanese way of saying "sun's origin", was written in kanji, it was given the characters .  In time, these characters began to be read using Sino-Japanese readings, first Nippon and later Nihon, although the two names are interchangeable to this day.

Nippon appeared in history only at the end of the 7th century. The Old Book of Tang, one of the Twenty-Four Histories, stated that the Japanese envoy disliked his country's name Woguo (Chinese), and changed it to Nippon (Japanese; Mandarin Chinese: Rìběn, Toisan Cantonese: Ngìp Bāwn), or "Origin of the Sun".   Another 8th-century chronicle, True Meaning of Shiji, however, states that the Chinese Empress Wu Zetian ordered a Japanese envoy to change the country's name to Nippon. It has been suggested that the name change in Japan may have taken place sometime between 665 and 703, and Wu Zetian then acceded to the name change in China following a request from a delegation from Japan in 703. The sun plays an important role in Japanese mythology and religion as the emperor is said to be the direct descendant of the sun goddess Amaterasu and the legitimacy of the ruling house rested on this divine appointment and descent from the chief deity of the predominant Shinto religion. The name of the country reflects this central importance of the sun. The association of the country with the sun was indicated in a letter sent in 607 and recorded in the official history of the Sui dynasty. Prince Shōtoku, the Regent of Japan, sent a mission to China with a letter in which he called the emperor of Japan (actually an empress at the time) . The message said: "The Son of Heaven, in the land of the rising sun, sends this letter to the Son of Heaven of the land, where the sun sets, and wishes him well".

The English word for Japan came to the West from early trade routes. The early Mandarin Chinese or possibly Wu Chinese word for Japan was recorded by Marco Polo as Cipangu. In modern Toisanese (a language in the Yue Chinese subgroup), 日本 is pronounced as Ngìp Bāwn [ŋip˦˨ bɔn˥], which sounds nearly identical to Nippon. The Malay and Indonesian words Jepang, Jipang, and Jepun were borrowed from non-Mandarin Chinese languages, and this Malay word was encountered by Portuguese traders in Malacca in the 16th century. It is thought the Portuguese traders were the first to bring the word to Europe. It was first recorded in English in 1577 spelled Giapan.

In English, the modern official title of the country is simply "Japan", one of the few countries to have no "long form" name. The official Japanese-language name is Nippon-koku or Nihon-koku, literally "State of Japan". From the Meiji Restoration until the end of World War II, the full title of Japan was the "Empire of Great Japan" ( Dai Nippon Teikoku).  A more poetic rendering of the name of Japan during this period was "Empire of the Sun." The official name of the nation was changed after the adoption of the post-war constitution; the title "State of Japan" is sometimes used as a colloquial modern-day equivalent. As an adjective, the term "Dai-Nippon" remains popular with Japanese governmental, commercial, or social organizations whose reach extend beyond Japan's geographic borders (e.g., Dai Nippon Printing, Dai Nippon Butoku Kai, etc.).

Though Nippon or Nihon are still by far the most popular names for Japan from within the country, recently the foreign words Japan and even Jipangu (from Cipangu, see below) have been used in Japanese mostly for the purpose of foreign branding.

Phonology
Portuguese missionaries arrived in Japan at the end of the 16th century. In the course of learning Japanese, they created several grammars and dictionaries of Middle Japanese. The 1603–1604 dictionary Vocabvlario da Lingoa de Iapam contains two entries for Japan: nifon and iippon.
The title of the dictionary (Vocabulary of the Language of Japan) illustrates that the Portuguese word for Japan was by that time Iapam.

Nifon

Historically, Japanese  has undergone a number of phonological changes. Originally *, this weakened into  and eventually became the modern .

Middle Japanese nifon becomes Modern Japanese nihon via regular phonological changes.

Jippon

Before modern styles of romanization, the Portuguese devised their own. In it,  is written as either ii or ji. In modern Hepburn style, iippon would be rendered as Jippon. There are no historical phonological changes to take into account here.

Unlike the Nihon/Nippon doublet, there is no evidence for a *Jihon.

Nihon and Nippon
The Japanese name for Japan, can be pronounced either Nihon or Nippon. Both readings come from the on'yomi.

Meaning
 (nichi) means "sun" or "day";  (hon) means "base" or "origin". The compound means "origin of the sun" or "where the sun rises" (from a Chinese point of view, the sun rises from Japan); it is a source for the popular Western description of Japan as the "Land of the Rising Sun".

Nichi, in compounds, often loses the final chi and creates a slight pause between the first and second syllables of the compound. When romanised, this pause is represented by a doubling of the first consonant of the second syllable; thus nichi  plus kō  (light) is written and pronounced nikkō, meaning sunlight.

Evolution
In compounds, however, final voiceless stops (i.e. p, t, k) of the first word were unreleased in Middle Chinese, and the pronunciation of 日本 was thus Nippon or Jippon (with the adjacent consonants assimilating).

Historical sound change in Japanese has led to the modern pronunciations of the individual characters as nichi and hon. The pronunciation Nihon originated, possibly in the Kantō region, as a reintroduction of this independent pronunciation of  into the compound. This must have taken place during the Edo period, after another sound change occurred which would have resulted in this form becoming Niwon and later Nion.

Several attempts to choose a definitive official reading were rejected by the Japanese government, which declared both to be correct.

Modern
While both pronunciations are correct, Nippon is frequently preferred for official purposes, including money, stamps, and international sporting events, as well as the Nippon-koku, literally the "State of Japan".

Other than this, there seem to be no fixed rules for choosing one pronunciation over the other, but in some cases, one form is simply more common. For example, Japanese-speakers generally call their language Nihongo; Nippongo, while possible,
is rarely used. In other cases, uses are variable. The name for the Bank of Japan, for example, is given as NIPPON GINKO on banknotes but is often referred to, such as in the media, as Nihon Ginkō.

Nippon is the form that is used usually or exclusively in the following constructions:

Nippon Yūbin, Nippon Yūsei (Japan Post Group)
Ganbare Nippon! (A sporting cheer used at international sporting events, roughly, 'do your best, Japan!')
Nipponbashi  (a shopping district in Osaka)
All Nippon Airways (Zen Nippon Kūyu)
Nippon Telegraph and Telephone (Nippon Denshin Denwa)
Nikon (Nippon Kōgaku Kōgyō)
Nippon Yusen
Nippon Steel (Nippon Seitetsu)
Nippon Professional Baseball (Nippon Yakyū Kikō)
Nippon Animation
Nippon Life Insurance
Nihon is used always or most often in the following constructions:
JR Higashi-Nihon (East Japan Railway, JR Group)
Nihonbashi (a bridge in Tokyo)
Nihon Daigaku (Nihon University)
Nihon-go (Japanese language)
Nihon-jin (日本人) (Japanese people)
Nihon-kai (Sea of Japan)
Nihon Kōkū (Japan Airlines)
Nihon-shoki (an old history book, never Nippon shoki)
Nihonshu (日本酒; meaning 'Japanese wine')
Zen Nihon Kendō Renmei (全日本剣道連盟, abbreviated 全剣連 Zen Ken Ren), the Japanese Kendo Federation referred in English as All Japan Kendo Federation (AJKF)
The Nippon TV network is called Nihon Terebi in Japanese.

In 2016, element 113 on the periodic table was named nihonium to honor its discovery in 2004 by Japanese scientists at RIKEN.

Jipangu

As mentioned above, the English word Japan has a circuitous derivation; but linguists believe it derives in part from the Portuguese recording of the early Mandarin Chinese or Wu Chinese word for Japan: Cipan, which is rendered in pinyin as Rìběn (IPA: ʐʅ˥˩pən˨˩˦), and literally translates to "sun origin". Guó (IPA: kuo˨˦) is Chinese for "realm" or "kingdom", so it could alternatively be rendered as Cipan-guo. The word was likely introduced to Portuguese through the Malay: Jipan.

Cipangu was first mentioned in Europe in the accounts of Marco Polo. It appears for the first time on a European map with the Fra Mauro map in 1457, although it appears much earlier on Chinese and Korean maps such as the Gangnido. Following the accounts of Marco Polo, Cipangu was thought to be fabulously rich in silver and gold, which in Medieval times was largely correct, owing to the volcanism of the islands and the possibility to access precious ores without resorting to (unavailable) deep-mining technologies.

The modern Shanghainese pronunciation of Japan is Zeppen . Jipangu ( (Zipangu)) as an obfuscated name for Japan has recently come into vogue for Japanese films, anime, video games, etc.

Other names

Classical

These names were invented after the introduction of Chinese into the language, and they show up in historical texts for prehistoric legendary dates and also in names of gods and Japanese emperors:

 Ōyashima meaning the Great Country of Eight (or Many) Islands, Awaji, Iyo (later Shikoku), Oki, Tsukushi (later Kyūshū), Iki, Tsushima, Sado, and Yamato (later Honshū); note that Hokkaidō, Karafuto, Chishima, and Okinawa were not part of Japan in ancient times, as Aynu Mosir (the northern part of the archipelago) was inhabited by a non-Japanese group, the Ainu. The eight islands refers to the creation of the main eight islands of Japan by the gods Izanami and Izanagi in Japanese mythology as well as the fact that eight was a synonym for "many".
 Yashima, "Eight (or Many) Islands"
 Fusō, a mythical tree or a mysterious land located to the East of China. The term later became a poetic name of Japan.
 Mizuho refers to ears of grain, e.g.  Mizuho-no-kuni "Country of Lush Ears (of Rice)." From Old Japanese midu > Japanese mizu ("water; lushness, freshness, juiciness") + Old Japanese fo > Japanese ho ("ear (of grain, especially rice)").
 Shikishima is written with Chinese characters that suggest a meaning "islands that one has spread/laid out," but this name of Japan supposedly originates in the name of an area in Shiki District of Yamato Province in which some emperors of ancient Japan resided. The name of Shikishima (i.e. Shiki District) came to be used in Japanese poetry as an epithet for the province of Yamato (i.e. the ancient predecessor of Nara Prefecture), and was metonymically extended to refer to the entire island of Yamato (i.e. Honshū) and, eventually, to the entire territory of Japan. Note that the word shima, though generally meaning only "island" in Japanese, also means "area, zone, territory" in many languages of the Ryūkyū Islands.
 Akitsukuni, Akitsushima, Toyo-akitsushima. According to the literal meanings of the Chinese characters used to transcribe these names of Japan, toyo means "abundant," aki means "autumn," tsu means "harbor," shima means "island," and kuni means "country, land." In this context, -tsu may be interpreted to be a fossilized genitive case suffix, as in matsuge "eyelash" (< Japanese me "eye" + -tsu + Japanese ke "hair") or tokitsukaze "a timely wind, a favorable wind" (< Japanese toki "time" + -tsu + Japanese kaze "wind"). However, akitu or akidu are also archaic or dialectal Japanese words for "dragonfly," so "Akitsushima" may be interpreted to mean . Another possible interpretation would take akitsu- to be identical with the akitsu- of akitsukami or akitsumikami ("god incarnate, a manifest deity," often used as an honorific epithet for the Emperor of Japan), perhaps with the sense of "the present land, the island(s) where we are at present."
 Toyoashihara no mizuho no kuni. "Country of Lush Ears of Bountiful Reed Plain(s)," Ashihara no Nakatsukuni, "Central Land of Reed Plains," "Country Amidst Reed Plain(s)".
 Hinomoto.

The katakana transcription  (Japan) of the English word Japan is sometimes encountered in Japanese, for example in the names of organizations seeking to project an international image. Examples include  (Japan Netto Ginkō) (Japan Net Bank),  (Japan Kappu) (Japan Cup),  (Waiyaresu Japan) (Wireless Japan), etc.

Dōngyáng and Dōngyíng – both literally, "Eastern Ocean" – are Chinese terms sometimes used to refer to Japan exotically when contrasting it with other countries or regions in eastern Eurasia; however, these same terms may also be used to refer to all of East Asia when contrasting "the East" with "the West". The first term, Dōngyáng, has been considered to be a pejorative term when used to mean "Japan", while the second, Dōngyíng, has remained a positive poetic name. They can be contrasted with Nányáng (Southern Ocean), which refers to Southeast Asia, and Xīyáng (Western Ocean), which refers to the Western world. In Japanese and Korean, the Chinese word for "Eastern Ocean" (pronounced as tōyō in Japanese and as dongyang in Korean) is used only to refer to the Far East (including both East Asia and Southeast Asia) in general, and it is not used in the more specific Chinese sense of "Japan".

In China, Japan is called Rìběn, which is the Mandarin pronunciation for the characters . The Cantonese pronunciation is Yahtbún , the Shanghainese pronunciation is Zeppen , and the Hokkien pronunciation is Ji̍tpún / Li̍t-pún. This has influenced the Malay name for Japan, Jepun, and the Thai word Yipun. The terms Jepang and Jipang, ultimately derived from Chinese, were previously used in both Malay and Indonesian, but are today confined primarily to the Indonesian language. The Japanese introduced Nippon and Dai Nippon into Indonesia during the Japanese Occupation (1942–1945) but the native Jepang remains more common. In Korean, Japan is called Ilbon (Hangeul: ,), which is the Korean pronunciation of the Sino-Korean name, and in Sino-Vietnamese, Japan is called Nhật Bản (also rendered as Nhựt Bổn). In Mongolian, Japan is called Yapon (Япон).

Ue-kok is recorded for older Hokkien speakers.  In the past, Korea also used , pronounced Waeguk.

Notation on old European maps
These are historic names of Japan that were noted on old maps issued in Europe.

, circa 1300
「IAPAM」, circa 1560
, 1561
「IAPAN」, circa 1567
「JAPAN」, unknown first year.
, 1595
「IAPAO」, 1628
「IAPON」, unknown first year.
「NIPHON」, circa 1694
「JAPAM」, 1628
「YAPAN」, 1628
, circa 1730
, 1739

Emoji
Unicode includes several character sequences that have been used to represent Japan graphically:
. Japan is the only country with a map representation in Unicode.
🇯🇵, a sequence of regional indicator symbols corresponding to JP that are often displayed as a flag of Japan.

Contemporary non-CJK names 
These are the contemporary non-CJK names for Japan in different languages.

See also
 Japanese name (names of Japanese people)
 Japanese place names
 Little China (ideology)
 List of country-name etymologies

Notes

References
 
  ; OCLC 48943301

 
Japanese language
Japan
Japan